Belot may refer to:

Belot, a trick-taking card game
Lac Belot, a lake in the Northwest Territories, Canada
Adolphe Belot (1829–1890), French playwright and novelist
Émile Belot (1857-1944), a French engineer and astronomer.
Gustave Belot (1859-1929), a French philosopher and educational administrator. 
Claude Belot, a French politician
Dame Belot, alias Octavie Guichard (1719–1805), a French writer
Franck Belot (b. 1972), a French rugby union player
Monti Belot, a United States federal judge
Victor R. Belot, French historian, writer and painter (1923–2000)

See also
Belote, another trick-taking card game